is a 1980 Japanese historical drama film directed by Kei Kumai, based on Yasushi Inoue's novel of the same name. The film follows a Japanese mission to Tang China during the Heian period.

Cast
 Katsuo Nakamura as Fushō
 Masaaki Daimon as Yōei
 Takahiro Tamura as Ganjin
 Mitsuo Hamada as Genrō
 Hisashi Igawa as Gyōgō
 Mieko Takamine as Yoroshime
 Hideko Yoshida as Koyoshi
 Daigo Kusano as Kaiyu
 Shōbun Inoue as Yoshihiko
 Yasukiyo Umeno as Kibi no Makibi 
 Kōji Takahashi as Abe no Nakamaro
 Osamu Takizawa as Rōben
 Takashi Shimura as Ryuson

References

External links
 

1980 films
1980 drama films
Japanese drama films
Films based on Japanese novels
Jidaigeki films
Films scored by Toru Takemitsu
1980s Japanese films